The sack of Dun Gallimhe or "Castle Galway" was fought in 1247 between the Normans and the Irish, resulting in a victory for the Irish.

Norman invasion of Ireland
1247 in Ireland
Conflicts in 1247
Dun G